Cathie Schweitzer is a former women's basketball coach at the University of Oklahoma, and Director of Athletics for Springfield College. She served as the 2nd head coach of the women's team at Oklahoma.

References

Oklahoma Sooners women's basketball coaches
American women's basketball coaches
Living people
Year of birth missing (living people)